Wayne Shaw (born 1939) is a retired outside linebacker who played twelve seasons for the Saskatchewan Roughriders of the Canadian Football League.

Early days
Educated at Athol Murray College of Notre Dame, Shaw played football for The Notre Dame Hounds and Saskatoon Hilltops before joining the Roughriders in 1961.

Roughrider
Wayne Shaw was a 6-time Western Division all-star player at the linebacker position. Shaw helped the Roughriders win the 54th Grey Cup of 1966 by a score of 29-14. He also played in the 55th Grey Cup of 1967 and the 57th Grey Cup of 1969, losses to the Hamilton Tiger-Cats and Ottawa Rough Riders.

Post-football
After his football career, Shaw ran a retail store in Winnipeg, Manitoba for 10 years. He returned to Saskatchewan where he owned and operated a bookstore in Saskatoon up to his retirement in 2009, at which time he donated thousands of books to the Athol Murray College of Notre Dame.

Videos
Seen in game 3 of the 1970 Western Conference finals in its entirety

References

External links
ProFootballArchives.com stats

1939 births
Living people
Athol Murray College of Notre Dame alumni
Canadian football linebackers
Players of Canadian football from Saskatchewan
Saskatchewan Roughriders players